Vtorye Korosteli is a rural locality (a selo) in Bolsheshelkovnikovsky Selsoviet, Rubtsovsky District, Altai Krai, Russia. The population was 228 as of 2013. There are 4 streets.

Geography 
Vtorye Korosteli is located 46 km southwest of Rubtsovsk (the district's administrative centre) by road. Bolshaya Shelkovka is the nearest rural locality.

References 

Rural localities in Rubtsovsky District